Bobby Tynan (born 7 December 1955, in Liverpool) is a footballer who played in midfielder for Tranmere Rovers and Blackpool.

References

1955 births
Living people
Footballers from Liverpool
Association football midfielders
English footballers
English expatriate footballers
Tranmere Rovers F.C. players
Chicago Sting (NASL) players
Blackpool F.C. players
Caernarfon Town F.C. players
English Football League players
North American Soccer League (1968–1984) players
Expatriate soccer players in the United States
English expatriate sportspeople in the United States